Logan Creek may refer to:

Australia 
 Logan Creek (Queensland), a stream in Central Queensland, Australia

United States 
 Logan Creek (Black River), a stream in Missouri, United States
 Logan Creek (St. Francis River), a stream in Missouri, United States
 Logan Creek (California), a stream in Columba County, California, United States
 Logan Creek Dredge, a canal in eastern Nebraska, United States
 Logan Creek, Nevada, an unincorporated community in Nevada, United States

Montana 
 Logan Creek (Blaine County), a stream in Blaine County, Montana, United States
 Logan Creek (Haystack Creek tributary), a stream in Flathead County, Montana, United States
 Logan Creek (Hungry Horse Reservoir tributary), a stream in Flathead County, Montana, United States
 Logan Creek (Tally Lake tributary), a stream in Flathead County, Montana, United States
 Logan Creek (Lincoln County), a stream in Lincoln County, Montana, United States